is a former Japanese professional darts player.

Career

World Championship results

BDO

 2014: Preliminary round (lost to Christian Kist 2-3) (sets)

External links
 Player profile at dartsdatacase.co.uk

References

Living people
Japanese darts players
British Darts Organisation players
1979 births